Leopoldo Sánchez Celis (February 14, 1916 – August 7, 1989) was a Mexican politician who was governor of Sinaloa from 1963 to 1968.

References 

1916 births
1989 deaths
Governors of Sinaloa
20th-century Mexican politicians
People from Cosalá Municipality
Politicians from Sinaloa